The Golden Gate Championship was a golf tournament on the PGA Tour that was played in September 1959 at San Francisco's storied Harding Park Golf Club.

The event was won by Mason Rudolph, a 25-year-old Tennessean by two strokes over Dow Finsterwald and Bob Goalby. It was his first victory on the PGA Tour.

Winners

References

Former PGA Tour events
Golf in California